Magdalena Department was one of the departments of Gran Colombia
In the east it bordered Zulia Department, in the south Boyaca Department, Cundinamarca Department, Cauca Department.

Provinces
 Cartagena Province
 Riohacha Province
 Santa Marta Province

Departments of Gran Colombia